S87 may refer to:
 , a submarine of the Royal Navy
 S87 Zhengzhou–Yuntaishan Expressway, China